Kazimierz Jan Sokołowski (26 March 1908 – 3 July 1998), was a Polish ice hockey player. He played for Lechia Lwów and Wisła Kraków during his career. He also played for the Polish national team at the 1932 and 1936 Winter Olympics, and multiple World Championships.

External links
 

1908 births
1998 deaths
Ice hockey players at the 1932 Winter Olympics
Ice hockey players at the 1936 Winter Olympics
Olympic ice hockey players of Poland
Polish ice hockey defencemen
Sportspeople from Lviv
Polish Austro-Hungarians
People from the Kingdom of Galicia and Lodomeria